Carlo Cokxxx Nutten ("Carlo Colucci [Italian fashion brand], Coke, Hookers") is an album by German rappers Bushido (alias Sonny Black) and Fler (alias Frank White). It was released on 21 October 2002 by Aggro Berlin.

In 2005, the follow-up Carlo Cokxxx Nutten II was released, again under Bushido's pseudonym "Sonny Black", with Baba Saad as replacement of Fler due to the feud between Aggro Berlin and Bushido. In 2009, after the closing of Aggro Berlin, Bushido and Fler ended their feud and released the third part as Carlo Cokxxx Nutten 2.

Background 
During that time, Bushido was signed to the label, along with his mates Sido and B-Tight. The album was Fler's first professional album release and appearance in public.

Bushido produced most of the beats and used the pseudonym "Sonny Black", inspired by film Donnie Brasco that was based on Dominick Napolitano. Fler used the pseudonym "Frank White", named after the character of King of New York. For the beat production, Bushido used a MPC and DJ Ilan mixed and edited the finished songs.

The album title came from a colleague of a former graffiti group. "Carlo" stands for the brand Carlo Colucci, "Cokxxx" for cocaine, and "Nutten" for prostitutes.

The song lyrics are most about the difficult life in the ghetto, including drugs, violence, force of arms, and prostitution.

Legacy 
The album is regarded as one of the most influential German gangsta rap albums. It achieved the breakthrough to the German-speaking gangsta rap and also for Aggro Berlin. Bushido and Fler became widely known in the German hip hop scene through the album's success. Bushido released his debut Vom Bordstein bis zur Skyline the following year 2003, which reached number 88 in German charts.

Track listing

Samples
"Intro, Electro, Ghetto" contains an excerpt from Full Metal Jacket
"Cordon Sport Massenmord" contains a sample of "The Devil's Stars Burn Cold" by Endvre
"Yo, peace man!" contains a sample of "She Is Dead" by Éric Serra
"Badewiese" contains a sample of "Heaven's Gate" by Joe Hisaishi & "Keep It Thoro" by Prodigy
"Carlo, Cokxxx, Nutten" contains a sample of "Viel zu viel" by Herbert Grönemeyer
"Boss" contains a sample of "A Kaleidoscope of Mathematic" by James Horner
"Wer will Krieg?" contains a sample of "The World Is One" by Forthcoming Fire
"Schau mich an" contains a sample of "Nash Descends Into Parcher's World" by James Horner
"Behindert" contains a sample of "The Cross" by Samael

References

External links 
  aggroberlin.de
  kingbushido.de
  fler.de

2002 albums
Bushido (rapper) albums
Fler albums
Collaborative albums
German-language albums